Bassen is a surname. Notable people with the surname include:

Bartholomeus van Bassen (1590–1652), Dutch Golden Age painter and architect
Bob Bassen (born 1965), retired Canadian ice hockey centre
Chad Bassen (born 1983), Canadian professional ice hockey forward
Frank Bassen, (1903–2003), haematologist and internist in New York, 1933–1978
Hank Bassen (1932–2009), Canadian ice hockey goaltender

See also
Bassens (disambiguation)